Sebastián Marroquín (born Juan Pablo Escobar Henao 24 February 1977) is a Colombian architect, author, and the son of Colombian drug lord Pablo Escobar.

Life
After the death of Pablo Escobar in 1993, Juan Pablo Escobar Henao, his mother, and his sister Manuela Escobar first fled to Mozambique, then traveled on tourist visas to Argentina, where they ultimately remained and became citizens in exile from their native Colombia. Juan Pablo chose the name "Sebastián Marroquín" from the telephone book and adopted it as his new name since he needed a new identity, stating in an interview with Skavlan that airlines refused to sell to him under the Escobar name.

Although he and his family continue to make money on the rights to Pablo Escobar's name and likeness (such as selling clothing bearing his likeness for extra income), and have tried three times (unsuccessfully) to register Escobar's name as a brand, Marroquín prefers not to be linked with his father because as he said in one of the interviews that after his death no one was helping them and faced death threats so they had to change their names to escape from there, which includes mention of his previous name; he is also determined to dissociate himself from the Medellín Cartel and the illegal drug trade in Colombia.

Marroquín graduated from college with a degree in architecture. He now lives in Palermo Soho, Buenos Aires with his wife and son, and works as an architect. He has since met with some of his father's victims. (See Sins of My Father, the 2009 documentary.)

Marroquín has returned to Colombia twice for visits: to pay his respects at his father's grave and for the documentary's premiere.

Sins of My Father
Sins of My Father (2009), an Argentine movie documentary five years in the making, "followed Marroquín as he apologized to the sons of victims his late father ordered assassinated during a decade of terrorizing Colombia during his time as a major drug lord." The film promoted reconciliation and ending hatred.

Pablo Escobar: My Father
Using his birth name, Juan Pablo Escobar, Marroquín authored the book Pablo Escobar: My Father (2014).

Controversies
Following the murder of a Netflix location scout for the crime drama series Narcos in Temascalapa, Mexico, Marroquín stated: "Nothing has changed except the names. Now there's even more drug-trafficking and corruption."

References

1977 births
Living people
People from Medellín
Colombian emigrants to Argentina
Pablo Escobar